The Focke-Wulf Nr. 238 Fernkampfflugzeug was a four-engine  strategic bomber developed by the  German aeronautical company Focke-Wulf-Flugzeugbau AG in the early 1940s and remained at the project stage. Designed to the same specifications issued by the Reichsluftfahrtministerium (RLM) which led to the Focke-Wulf Ta 400 and Junkers Ju 390, its development was cancelled by the RLM.

Design and development
In March 1941 the Reichsluftfahrtministerium (ministry of the air, abbreviated RLM), the ministry that during the Nazi period was responsible for the whole aviation of Germany, expressed the need to acquire a new long-range bombardment aircraft capable of carrying a war load of 5,000 kg of bombs with a range of 15,000 km. Focke-Wulf and Junkers responded to the request by starting a project for a large tactical bomber suitable to meet the specifications issued.

Focke-Wulf planned the development of an all-encompassing four-engine aircraft in a trailing configuration that could be equipped with the best engines currently being developed, the BMW 803 of 3 900 PS combined with four-bladed propellers counter-rotating or BMW 801. The baseline design conceived under drawing Nr. 238 had four BMW 803s, a long fuselage integrated the cockpit pressurized for the five (or according to other sources ten) crew members on the front, the ventral bomb compartment and an twin-tail, chosen to improve the field of fire of the two barbette hydraulically driven dorsal turrets equipped with a pair of  MG 151/20 gauge 20 mm autocannons. An additional two identical ventral turrets and, optional for the anti-shipping configuration, a gondola equipped with 4 cannons MK 108 caliber 30 mm. The landing gear was the typical tail-wheel configuration, with the two front axle springs cushioned and equipped with twin wheels integrated by a retractible tailwheel. A somewhat smaller four-engine version, equipped with radial BMW 801 D, with a length of 30.6 m by 5.8 m height with a 50 m opening wing and a surface area of 240 m². Although these designs are known in some sources as Fw 238, this was a postwar invention by some aviation historians derived from Nr. 238 for the early BMW-powered Focke-Wulf Fernkampfflugzeug designs.

In reality none of the versions passed the design phase and their development, which according to some estimates could have been completed with a prototype able to fly by the end of 1944, was terminated by an order dated 14 February 1943 in which the RLM required companies to devote themselves as a priority to the development of models to be used in the air defense of the Reich.

Variants 
 Nr 238
 four-engine version equipped with BMW 803 radial engines driving counter-rotating propellers.
 Nr. 238H
 small four-engine variant, length - , height - , span - , wing area , equipped with BMW 801 engines.

Specifications (Nr. 238, larger design)

References

Further reading 
 

Focke-Wulf aircraft